Motor Barnaul was an ice hockey team in Barnaul, Russia.

History
The club was founded in 1959 as the successor club to Spartak Barnaul, which had been founded in 1954. In Soviet times, Barnaul participated in various lower-level leagues. 

In the 1998–99 season the club participated in the second-level league organized by the Ice Hockey Federation of Russia. From 1999-2006, the club participated in the second-level Russian league, the Vysshaya Liga. 

The club was dissolved due to financial problems in 2006. It was replaced by Altai Barnaul, which currently competes in the third-level Russian league, the Pervaya Liga.

External links
 Team profile on eurohockey.com

Ice hockey teams in Russia
Sports clubs disestablished in 2006